Kipoureio or Kipourio is a village and a community of the Grevena municipality. Before the 2011 local government reform it was a part of the municipality of Gorgiani, of which it was a municipal district and the seat. The 2011 census recorded 206 residents in the village. The community of Kipoureio covers an area of 40.285 km2. According to the statistics of Vasil Kanchov ("Macedonia, Ethnography and Statistics"), 600 Greek Christians lived in the village in 1900.

See also
List of settlements in the Grevena regional unit

References

Populated places in Grevena (regional unit)